Loni Klettl (born 8 September 1959) is a Canadian former alpine skier who competed in the 1980 Winter Olympics.

References

1959 births
Living people
Canadian female alpine skiers
Olympic alpine skiers of Canada
Alpine skiers at the 1980 Winter Olympics
20th-century Canadian women